Clare Oumou Verbeten is an American politician serving as a member of the Minnesota Senate for the 66th district since 2023. She and Erin Maye Quade were the first openly LGBTQ women and first Black women elected to the Minnesota Senate.

Early life and education 
Oumou Verbeten was born and raised in Minnesota. She earned a Bachelor of Arts degree in law and society from American University in 2016.

Career 
As a college student, Oumou Verbeten worked as an intern for the Minnesota Democratic–Farmer–Labor Party, the National Immigrant Women's Advocacy Project, Women Winning, and the Democratic National Committee. She returned to the Minnesota DFL in 2016 as deputy public affairs director. In 2017 and 2018, she was the deputy political director for Tim Walz's gubernatorial campaign. After the campaign, Oumou Verbeten worked as deputy political director of the North Central States Regional Council of Carpenters and as a community affairs specialist for Mortenson Construction. From 2019 to 2022, she served as an equity and inclusion program manager for the city of Saint Paul, Minnesota.

References 

Living people
Democratic Party Minnesota state senators
American University alumni
Year of birth missing (living people)
21st-century American politicians
21st-century American women politicians